The 2002 FIVB Women's World Championship was the fourteenth edition of the tournament, organised by the world's governing body, the FIVB. It was held from 30 August to 15 September 2002 in Berlin, Bremen, Dresden, Münster, Schwerin, Riesa, Leipzig, and Stuttgart, Germany. The tournament saw the discontinuation of Cuba's historic eight consecutive world titles, as the team finished fifth after being eliminated by the United States in the quarterfinals.

Qualification

Source: FIVB

Squads

Venues

Source:

Format
The tournament was played in three different stages (first, second and final rounds). A single round-robin format was played within each group to determine the teams group position, the three best teams of each group (total of 12 teams) progressed to the next round.

A single round-robin format was played within each group to determine the teams group position, the two best teams of each group and the two best third places (total of 8 teams) progressed to the next round. 

The  was played in a single elimination format, with placement matches determining the top eight positions. Starting at the quarterfinals, winners advanced to the semifinals while losers advanced to the placement matches (5th-8th semifinal). Winners and losers of each semifinals played a final placement match for 1st to 8th places.

For the tournament's final standings, teams which did not reach placement matches were allocated as:
 All four teams finishing 6th in each  pool were ranked 21st.
 All four teams finishing 5th in each  pool were ranked 17th.
 All four teams finishing 4th in each  pool were ranked 13th.
 All three teams finishing 4th in each  pool were ranked 10th.

Source: FIVB

Pools composition
Teams were seeded in the first three positions of each pool following the Serpentine system according to their FIVB World Ranking. FIVB reserved the right to seed the hosts as head of Pool A regardless of the World Ranking. All teams not seeded were drawn to take other available positions in the remaining lines.

Results
All times are Central European Summer Time (UTC+02:00).

First round

Pool A
Venue: Halle Münsterland, Münster

|}

|}

Pool B
Venue: Sport/Congresshalle, Schwerin

|}

|}

Pool C
Venues: Sachsen Arena, Riesa and Mehrzweckhalle, Dresden

|}

|}

Pool D
Venue: Mehrzwecksporthalle, Leipzig

|}

|}

Second round

Pool E
Venue: Stadthalle, Bremen

|}

|}

Pool F
Venue: Hanns-Martin-Schleyer-Halle, Stuttgart

|}

|}

Pool G
Venue: Sachsen Arena, Riesa

|}

|}

Final round
Venues: Stadthalle, Bremen and Hanns-Martin-Schleyer-Halle, Stuttgart and Max-Schmeling-Halle, Berlin

Quarterfinals

|}

5th–8th places

5th–8th Semifinals

|}

7th place match

|}

5th place match

|}

Finals

Semifinals

|}

3rd place match

|}

Final

|}

Final standing

Awards

 Most Valuable Player
  Elisa Togut
 Best Scorer
  Yumilka Ruíz
 Best Spiker
  Elizaveta Tichtchenko
 Best Blocker
  Danielle Scott
 Best Server
  Nancy Carrillo

 Best Setter
  Marcelle Moraes
 Best Digger
  Koo Ki-lan
 Best Receiver
  Koo Ki-lan
 Fair Play Award
  Paola Cardullo

References

External links
 Results
 Federation Internationale de Volleyball

W
V
FIVB Volleyball Women's World Championship
International volleyball competitions hosted by Germany
August 2002 sports events in Europe
Women's volleyball in Germany
September 2002 sports events in Europe